Sundevall's worm snake (Tricheilostoma sundewalli) is a species of snake in the family Leptotyphlopidae. The species is endemic to Central Africa and West Africa.

Etymology
The epithet, sundewalli, is in honor of Carl Jakob Sundevall, a Swedish zoologist.

Geographic range
T. sundewalli is found in Cameroon, Central African Republic, Ghana, Nigeria, and Togo.

References

Further reading
Adalsteinsson SA, Branch WR, Trape S, Vitt LJ, Hedges SB (2009). "Molecular phylogeny, classification, and biogeography of snakes of the family Leptotyphlopidae (Reptilia, Squamata)". Zotaxa 2244: 1-50. (Guinea sundewalli, new combination).
Boulenger GA (1893). Catalogue of the Snakes in the British Museum (Natural History). Volume I., Containing the Families Typhlopidæ, Glauconiidæ ... London: Trustees of the British Museum (Natural History). (Taylor and Francis, printers). xiii + 448 pp. + Plates I-XXVIII. ("Glauconia sundevallii [sic]", p. 68).
Jan G (1862). "Note sulla famiglia dei Tiflopidi sui loro generi e sulle specie del genere Stenostoma". Archivio per la Zoologia l'Anatomia e la Fisiologia 1: 178-199. (Stenostoma sundewalli, new species, p. 191). (in Italian).
Hedges SB (2011). "The type species of the threadsnake genus Tricheilostoma Jan revisited (Squamata, Leptotyphlopidae)". Zootaxa 3027: 63-64. (Tricheilostoma sundewalli, new combination).

Tricheilostoma
Reptiles described in 1861